The Men's R7 50 metre rifle 3 positions SH1 event at the 2020 Summer Paralympics took place on 3 September at the Asaka Shooting Range in Tokyo.

The event consisted of two rounds: a qualifier and a final. The top 8 shooters in the qualifying round moved on to the final round.

Records
Prior to this competition, the existing world and Paralympic records were as follows.

Schedule
All times are Japan Standard Time (UTC+9)

Results

Qualification

Final

References

Shooting at the 2020 Summer Paralympics